Fakhrabad (also Romanized as Fakhrābād; also known as Fakhrābād Tang-e Ḩanā) is a village in Hana Rural District, Abadeh Tashk District, Neyriz County, Fars Province, Iran. At the 2006 census, its population was 295, in 58 families.

References 

Populated places in Abadeh Tashk County